Baker River may refer to one of the following rivers:

Damas River (Chile), a river traversing the city Osorno in southern Chile
Pichi Damas River, a river in Osorno Province in southern Chile
Damas River (Eritrea), one of the principal watercourses of Eritrea